Madawaska Valley Airpark or Barry's Bay/Madawaska Valley Airpark  is located  northeast of Barry's Bay, Ontario, Canada.

References

Transport Canada - Canadian Aerodromes

Registered aerodromes in Ontario